The Panagia Theoskepastos Monastery ("Panagia the God-guarded"), today known in Turkish as Kızlar Monastery, is a former female monastery built during the Empire of Trebizond.

It lies at the foot of Boztepe mountain over looking the city of Trabzon. The monastery complex built on two terraces, is surrounded by a protective high wall. The monastery was founded in the reign of Alexios III (1349–1390). Having undergone major repairs several times it assumed its present form in the 19th century. The monastery initially comprised the rock church on the south side the chapel in its entrance and a few cells. Inside the rock church there are inscriptions and portraits of Alexios III, his wife Theodora and his mother Irene.

Gallery

Notes and references

Greek Orthodox monasteries in Turkey
Archaeological sites in the Black Sea Region
Religious museums in Turkey
Empire of Trebizond
Buildings and structures in Trabzon
Ruined churches in Turkey
Museums in Trabzon Province
Byzantine church buildings in Turkey
Christian monasteries established in the 14th century
1376 establishments in Asia